Extrajudicial killings and forced disappearances in the Philippines are illegal executionsunlawful or felonious killingsand forced disappearances in the Philippines. These are forms of extrajudicial punishment, and include extrajudicial executions, summary executions, arbitrary arrest and detentions, and failed prosecutions due to political activities of leading political, trade union members, dissident and/or social figures, left-wing political parties, non-governmental organizations, political journalists, outspoken clergy, anti-mining activists, agricultural reform activists, members of organizations that are alleged as allied or legal fronts of the communist movement (such as the "Bayan group") or claimed supporters of the NPA and its political wing, the Communist Party of the Philippines (CPP).

Extrajudicial killings are most commonly referred to as "salvaging" in Philippine English. The word is believed to be a direct Anglicization of Tagalog salbahe ("cruel", "barbaric"), from Spanish salvaje ("wild", "savage").

EJKs that occurred during the administration of Rodrigo Duterte, at the sub-national level, are more likely to occur in provinces that have high population densities, stronger state capacities, and those that are more affluent in terms of economic development. It is also found that higher rates of EJKs are correlated with provinces that have severe drug affectation rates, and those areas where Duterte's vote share in the 2016 elections are highest, indicating the presence of vertical accountability.

Nature
Philippine extrajudicial killings are politically motivated murders committed by government officers, punished by local and international law or convention. They include assassinations; deaths due to strafing or indiscriminate firing; massacre; summary execution is done if the victim becomes passive before the moment of death (i.e., abduction leading to death); assassination means forthwith or instant killing while massacre is akin to genocide or mass extermination; thus, killings occurred in many regions or places throughout the Philippines in different times - 136 killings in Southern Tagalog region were recorded by human rights group Karapatan from 2001 to May 19, 2006.

Desaparecidos 
A forced disappearance (desaparecidos), on the other hand, as form of extrajudicial punishment is perpetrated by government officers, when any of its public officers abducts an individual, to vanish from public view, resulting to murder or plain sequestration. The victim is first kidnapped, then illegally detained in concentration camps, often tortured, and finally executed and the corpse hidden. In Spanish and Portuguese, "disappeared people" are called desaparecidos, a term which specifically refers to the mostly South American victims of state terrorism during the 1970s and the 1980s, in particular concerning Operation Condor. In the International Convention for the Protection of All Persons from Enforced Disappearance, "Enforced disappearance" is defined in Article 2 of the United Nations Convention Against Torture as "the arrest, detention, abduction or any other form of deprivation of liberty by agents of the State or by persons or groups of persons acting with the authorization, support or acquiescence of the State, followed by a refusal to acknowledge the deprivation of liberty or by concealment of the fate or whereabouts of the disappeared person, which place such a person outside the protection of the law."

Even if Philippine Republic Act No. 7438 provides for the rights of persons arrested, detained, it does not punish acts of enforced disappearances. Thus, on August 27, Bayan Muna (People First), Gabriela Women's Party (GWP), and Anakpawis (Toiling Masses) filed House Bill 223, later promulgated as Republic Act No. 10353"An act defining and penalizing the crime of enforced or involuntary disappearance." Sen. Jinggoy Estrada also filed on June 30, 2007, Senate Bill No. 2405"An Act Penalizing the Commission of Acts of Torture and Involuntary Disappearance of Persons Arrested, Detained or Under Custodial Investigation, and Granting Jurisdiction to the Commission on Human Rights to Conduct Preliminary Investigation for Violation of the Custodial Rights of the Accused, Amending for this Purpose Sections 2, 3 and 4 of RA 7438, and for Other Purposes."

Background

Marcos regime
In 1995, 10,000 Filipinos won a U.S. class-suit against the Ferdinand Marcos estate. The charges were filed by victims or their surviving relatives for torture, execution and disappearances. Human rights groups placed the number of victims of extrajudicial killings under martial law at 1,500 and over 800 abductions; Karapatan (a local human rights group's) records show 759 involuntarily disappeared (their bodies never found). Military historian Alfred McCoy in his book Closer than Brothers: Manhood at the Philippine Military Academy and in his speech "Dark Legacy" cites 3,257 extrajudicial killings, 35,000 torture victims, and 70,000 incarcerated during the Marcos years. The newspaper Bulatlat places the number of victims of arbitrary arrest and detention at 120,000.

The New People's Army (NPA) groups known as "Sparrow Units" were active in the mid-1980s, killing government officials, police personnel, military members, and anyone else they targeted for elimination. They were also part of an NPA operation called "Agaw Armas" (Filipino for "Stealing Weapons"), where they raided government armories as well as stealing weapons from slain military and police personnel. A low level civil war with south Muslims, Al-Qaeda sympathizers and communist insurgents has led to a general break down of law and order. The Philippines government has promised to curb the killings, but is itself implicated in many of the killings.

Since 1975, the Armed Forces of the Philippines (AFP) has been deeply involved in politics. Because of the armed conflict, the military continued its campaign versus the New People's Army of the Communist Party of the Philippines (CPP). Since 1969 it aimed to establish a Marxist regime with armed rebellion against the government.

Under President Gloria Macapagal Arroyo, left-wing nongovernmental organizations were critical of her administration. Members of these organizations who were red-tagged as members of the CPP and NPA were targeted in a series of political killings. Human Rights Watch investigated extrajudicial murders in the Philippines in September 2007.
Three major investigation groups were commissioned and their final reports were submitted and published: the Gloria Macapagal Arroyo government-appointed bodies: a) Task Force Usig created by her on August; as a special police body, it was assigned to solve 10 cases of killings; it claimed having solved 21 cases, by initiating court cases, but only 12 suspects were arrested; b) the Melo Commission (chaired by Supreme Court Associate Justice Jose Melo) with members National Bureau of Investigation Director Nestor Mantaring, Chief State Prosecutor Jovencito Zuño, Bishop Juan de dios Pueblos, and Nelia Torres Gonzales; its final report states: "There is no official or sanctioned policy on the part of the military or its civilian superiors to resort to what other countries euphemistically call "alternative procedures"meaning illegal executions. However, there is certainly evidence pointing the finger of suspicion at some elements and personalities in the armed forces, in particular General Jovito Palparan, as responsible for an undetermined number of killings, by allowing, tolerating, and even encouraging the killings." (Melo Commission report, p. 53), and c) Philip Alston, the United Nations Special Rapporteur on Extrajudicial Executions (February 12 to 21, 2007).

Remedies

Malacañang's peace summit and Puno's killings summit
 Because of the magnitude of Philippine killings and desaparecidos, 22nd Chief Justice Reynato Puno of the Supreme Court of the Philippines called a National Consultative Summit on extrajudicial killings on July 16 and 17, 2007, at the Manila Hotel. Participants included representatives from government (including the Armed Forces of the Philippines, the PNP, Commission on Human Rights (Philippines), media, academe, civil society, and other stakeholders. On the other hand, the Malacañang-sponsored "Mindanao Peace and Security Summit" (July 8–10, 2007, in Cagayan de Oro) concentrated on the anti-terror law, or the Human Security Act (HSA) of 2007, to make it more acceptable to the public. At the July 16 summit, Reynato Puno stated that the Commission on Human Rights reported the number of victims at 403 from 2001 to May 31, 2007, while Karapatan reported 863 deaths until 2007, and more than 900 as of May 2008, and most of them were members of left-wing groups. Karapatan gave a breakdown of its figures on human rights violations: 7,442 victims of forced evacuations or displacement, 5,459 victims of indiscriminate firing of weapons, and 3,042 victims of food and economic blockade. The rights group Desparecidos officially reported as of May 15, 2008, 194 victims of enforced disappearances under the Arroyo administration, with the latest abduction of National Democratic Front political consultant for Cagayan Valley, activist Randy Felix Malayao, 39, a volunteer worker.
 Counsels for the Defense of Liberties (CODAL), Philippines, a lawyers’ organization stated that since 2001, 26 lawyers and 10 judges were killed due to their professions; 755 civilians had been killed extrajudicially, while 359 survived attacks, but 184 persons were still missing.
 Bishop Deogracias Iñiguez stated that on the CBCP/Catholic Church's count, the number of victims of extrajudicial killings is 778, while survivors of "political assassinations" reached 370; 203 "massacre" were victims, 186, missing or involuntarily disappeared, 502, tortured, or illegally arrested. Iñiguez denounced the government's implementation of its Oplan Bantay Laya I and II.

Promulgation of Writs of Amparo and Habeas Data

Because of the inefficacy and insufficiency of the Philippines Writ of Habeas Corpus, on September 25, 2007, Chief Justice Reynato Puno signed and released the Writ of Amparo: "This rule will provide the victims of extralegal killings and enforced disappearances the protection they need and the promise of vindication for their rights. This rule empowers our courts to issue reliefs that may be granted through judicial orders of protection, production, inspection and other relief to safeguard one's life and liberty The writ of amparo shall hold public authorities, those who took their oath to defend the constitution and enforce our laws, to a high standard of official conduct and hold them accountable to our people. The sovereign Filipino people should be assured that if their right to life and liberty is threatened or violated, they will find vindication in our courts of justice'." Puno explained the interim reliefs under amparo: temporary protection order (TPO), inspection order (IO), production order (PO), and witness protection order (WPO, RA 6981). As supplement to Amparo, on August 30, 2007, Puno (at Silliman University in Dumaguete, Negros Oriental) promised to release also the writ of habeas data (“you should have the idea” or “you should have the data”) another new legal remedy to solve the extrajudicial killings and enforced disappearances. Puno explained that the writ of amparo denies to authorities defense of simple denial, and habeas data can find out what information is held by the officer, rectify or even the destroy erroneous data gathered. Brazil used the writ, followed by Colombia, Paraguay, Peru, Argentina and Ecuador.
 On December 3, 2007, Reynato S. Puno stated that the writ released only three victims (including Luisito Bustamante, Davao City), since amparo was enforced on October 24: "I would like to think that after the enactment and effectivity (of the writ), the number of extrajudicial killings and disappearances have gone down."
 On December 17, 2007, Iloilo regional trial court Judge Narciso Aguilar granted a writ of amparo against President Gloria Macapagal Arroyo and 9 military and police officials to release Nilo Arado and Maria Luisa Posa-Dominado activists abducted on April 12.
 On December 19, 2007, Dr. Edita Burgos petitioned the Philippine Court of Appeals to issue a writ of amparo against Armed Forces chief Gen. Hermogenes Esperon Jr. and Army chief Lt. Gen. Alexander Yano regarding her son Jonas's abduction on April 28.
 On December 27, 2007, the 2nd Division, Court of Appeals 30-page decision penned by Associate Justice Lucas Bersamin granted the writ of amparo filed by Reynaldo and Raymond Manalo, abducted activists.
 Center for International Law (CenterLaw) filed a petition for a writ of amparo on behalf of families of victims of the drug war of the government of the Philippines in October 2017. The Supreme Court (SC) of the Philippines granted the writ and ordered the police to turn over documents relating to their investigations on the drug war. In the same month, the Free Legal Assistance Group (FLAG), on behalf of families and a survivor of an alleged execution by local police, filed for a writ of amparo before the SC. After hearings on a motion for reconsideration by the Office of the Solicitor General, the SC on April 3, 2018, upheld its earlier decision and ordered the solicitor general and the Philippine National Police to submit data related to the government's war on drugs.

Comment 
On September 28, 2007, the Asian Human Rights Commission (AHRC) commented that the amparo and habeas data in themselves were insufficient in themselves to protect human rights in the country: "Though it responds to practical areas it is still necessary that further action must be taken in addition to this. The legislative bodies, House of Representatives and Senate, should also initiate its own actions promptly and without delay. They must enact laws which ensure protection of rights—laws against torture and enforced disappearance and laws to afford adequate legal remedies to victims." AHRC added that the writs are not enough to protect non-witnesses, even though they, too, face threats to their lives.

International groups' 2006 and 2008 probe of killings
In 2006, the Dutch Lawyers for Lawyers Foundation and Lawyers without Borders with the support of the Netherlands Bar Association, the Amsterdam Bar Association and the International Association of Democratic Lawyers created a fact-finding mission in different parts of the Philippines. The international groups conducted interviews of various legal sectors from June 15 to 20, 2006.

From November 4–12, 2008, the Dutch Lawyers for Lawyers Foundation will conduct a follow-up verification and fact finding mission (IVFFM) in Manila and Mindanao, with the National Host Committee, National Union of Peoples' Lawyers (NUPL) and the Counsels for the Defense of Liberties (CODAL). This team is composed of 8 judges and lawyers from Belgium and Netherlands, who had dialogue with Reynato Puno on the probe of killings.

"Desaparecidos" law 
The Anti-Enforced or Involuntary Disappearance Act of 2012 was signed into law by President Benigno Aquino III on December 21, 2012. The law's principal author in Congress was Rep. Edcel Lagman.

The law is the first law in Asia that makes the crime of enforced disappearance punishable by life imprisonment. It was hailed as a milestone law by Human Rights Watch, which called the law "a testament to the thousands of 'disappearance' victims since the Marcos dictatorship, whose long-suffering families are still searching for justice."

The law treats enforced disappearances as a violation of human rights and a crime separate from kidnapping, serious illegal detention, and murder. Under the law, those guilty of enforced disappearances before the law was passed can still be prosecuted if they continue refusing to disclose the whereabouts of the victim, according to Rep. Neri Colmenares.

International reports - the root cause of killings

Alston UN report
 Philip Alston submitted his final report on the killings; he found that the Armed Forces of the Philippines killed left-wing activists to get rid of communist insurgents: "the executions had "eliminated civil society leaders, including human rights defenders, trade unionists and land reform advocates, intimidated a vast number of civil society actors, and narrowed the country’s political discourse." Alston denied for lack of merit the government's claim that killings were perpetrated by communists to exterminate spies and to make negative propaganda versus government. Alston, in February 2007 stated that the military made alibis or denials on its role about 800 deaths of activists and journalists since 2001. Alston blamed "impunity" which caused the executions of journalists and leftist activists: "the priorities of the criminal justice system had been "distorted," and had "increasingly focused on prosecuting civil society leaders rather than their killers." But Alston noted the government's creation ofspecial courts to try extrajudicial killings, the Melo Commission and the Philippine National Police's Task Force Usig. In the November U.N. Alston report - the killings in 2007 was only 68, huge drop from the 209 murdered in 2006. Karapatan published its report however, listing 830 victims of extrajudicial killings since 2001, under Gloria Macapagal Arroyo. On March 1, 2007, the Supreme Court of the Philippines issued Administrative Order No. 25-2007, which created by designation 99 regional trial courts to try cases of killings and desaparecidos.

Failed investigations and prosecutions
The United Nations Special Rapporteur on Extrajudicial Execution found that just on paper trails, cases are filed; but Alston officially concluded that “there is a passivity, bordering on an abdication of responsibility, which affects the way in which key institutions and actors approach their responsibilities in relation to such human rights concerns; prosecutors refused to take a role in gathering evidence, and instead being purely passive, waiting for the police to present them with a file; the Ombudsman’s office did almost nothing in recent years in this regard, failing to act in any of the 44 complaints alleging extrajudicial executions attributed to State agents submitted from 2002 to 2006." (“Preliminary note on the visit of the Special Rapporteur on extrajudicial, summary or arbitrary executions, Philip Alston, to the Philippines (12–21 February 2007),” A/HRC/4/20/Add.3, March 22, 2007, p. 4., etc.)

Eric G. John and G. Eugene Martin testimonies
 On March 14, 2007, Eric G. John, Deputy Assistant Secretary for East Asian and Pacific Affairs testified before the USA Senate Subcommittee on Foreign Relations at Washington, D.C. John submitted his written statement: a) the increase in extrajudicial killings, b) the “Huk Rebellion” in the 1940s and 50s causing thousands of murdered victims; c) the communist New People's Army (NPA), which was listed in the U.S. State Department list of Foreign Terrorist Organizations campaigned to overthrow the government since 1968; d) Extrajudicial killings by the security forces, the NPA, etc. during the Marcos regime, were less; and e) noted the report of UN Special Rapporteur Alston which submitted the Philippine Government's recognition of the gravity of the problem, expresses concern about the views of the Armed Forces of the Philippines (AFP) regarding the problem, but much had to submitted that the reforms made did not and will not resolve the killings. Mr. Alston's March report stated that "the question of resources or technical expertise will partly resolve the killings but the strong risk is that these measures will treat only some of the symptoms of the crisis, and will fail to address meaningfully two of the most important underlying causes of a great many of the killings." (A/HRC/4/20/Add.3, March 22, 2007) Alston named two root causes of the killings: (1) 'vilification', 'labeling’, or 'guilt by association'"characterization of most groups on the left of the political spectrum as ‘front organizations’ for armed groups whose aim is to destroy democracy" making the groups "considered to be legitimate targets; and (2) the Government’s counter-insurgency strategy's extent of facilitating killings of activists and others. G. Eugene Martin specifically expanded the 2 causes of the violence and killings: a) weak political and social institutions, corrupt and ineffective judicial system, resulting to failure to obtain justice from corrupt Philippine courts; and b) the legacy of the Ferdinand Marcos regime; Martial law caused the corrupt system where soldiers, police, judges and prosecutors became principals of offenses like extralegal arrest, detention, incarceration, disappearances and killings (salvaging), all permitted or allowed. He traced the spate of violence and killings to political instability of President Arroyo government; while she created the Independent Commission to Address Media and Activist Killings, Melo Commission, she had no capability to end the killings, due to her political lameness because of the 2004 election controversy.

FIDH report
 Three experts from the International Federation for Human Rights (abbreviated FIDH), Mr. Nabeel Rajab (Bahrain), Mr. Mouloud Boumghar (France) and Mr. Frédéric Ceuppens (Belgium), came to the Philippines on August 13 to 23, 2007. Their FIDH mission report stated that torture and ill-treatment was widespread versus suspected "terrorists". The Filipino government is a signatory to the International Covenant on Civil and Political Rights (ICCPR), and the UN Convention against Torture (CAT). The FIDH dismissed the Philippines government's claim doubts that mechanisms were placed to stop the killings, as it questioned the efficiency ofthe corrupt judiciary, the government “Witness Protection Programme” ; also, judges and lawyers were victims themselves of killings. It also found the Philippine anti-terrorism law ( “Human Security Act”) to result in more torture and extrajudicial killings as a fight against terrorism.

2008 US Department of State report
On March 11, 2008, the US Department of State reported that "arbitrary, unlawful arrests and extrajudicial and political killings continued to be a major problem in the Philippines in 2007. Washington stated that "many of these killings went unsolved and unpunished despite intensified efforts of the government to investigate and prosecute these cases."

Judicial corruption
On January 25, 2005, and on December 10, 2006, Philippines Social Weather Stations released the results of its two surveys on corruption in the judiciary; it published that: a) like 1995, 1/4 of lawyers said many/very many judges are corrupt. But (49%) stated that a judges received bribes, just 8% of lawyers admitted they reported the bribery, because they could not prove it. [Tables 8-9]; judges, however, said, just 7% call many/very many judges as corrupt[Tables 10-11];b) "Judges see some corruption; proportions who said - many/very many corrupt judges or justices: 17% in reference to RTC judges, 14% to MTC judges, 12% to Court of Appeals justices, 4% i to Shari'a Court judges, 4% to Sandiganbayan justices and 2% in reference to Supreme Court justices [Table 15].

Maguindanao massacre

In the Maguindanao massacre in the Philippines on November 23, 2009, 57 people were killed while en route to file an electoral certificate of candidacy for Esmael Mangudadatu, vice mayor of Buluan town, in upcoming gubernatorial elections for Maguindanao province. The dead included Mangudadatu's wife, his two sisters, journalists, lawyers, aides, and motorists who were witnesses. At least 198 suspects were charged with murder, including incumbent governor Andal Ampatuan Sr., and his son, Andal Ampatuan Jr. who was to be a candidate to succeed him. On November 16, 2010, the international non-governmental organization Human Rights Watch issued a 96 page report titled "They Own the People," charting the Ampatuans’ rise to power, including their use of violence to expand their control and eliminate threats to the family's rule.

Duterte's War on Drugs

On July 2, 2016, the Communist Party of the Philippines stated that it "reiterates its standing order for the NPA to carry out operations to disarm and arrest the chieftains of the biggest drug syndicates, as well as other criminal syndicates involved in human rights violations and destruction of the environment" after its political wing Bagong Alyansang Makabayan accepted Cabinet posts in the new government. On July 3, the Philippine National Police said they had killed 30 alleged drug dealers since Duterte was sworn in as president on June 30. They later stated they had killed 103 suspects between May 10 and July 7.

On August 26, 2016, the official death total reached 2,000. Official records from the Philippine Drug Enforcement Agency give the number of deaths from July 2016 to November 2018 from the anti-drug campaign as 5,050. Human rights groups have put the number of killings at 20,000, including vigilante-style killings.

Events
On February 27, 2007, U.S. ambassador to the Philippines Kristie Kenney called on President Arroyo to end these extrajudicial killings: "Let's beef up the human rights in the Armed Forces of the Philippines and make every effort to investigate, prosecute those responsible, [and] exonerate the innocent." In August 2007, the International Day of the Disappeared, Asian Human Rights Commission (AHRC) ranked the Philippines among the top eight countries in Asia where forced disappearances of activists are not just rampant but are done with impunity. Sri Lanka headed the list. The activists took part in the recent Human Rights School Session of the AHRC for 2007. The AHRC listed the other countries where forced disappearances take place with impunity: Pakistan, Indonesia, Bangladesh, Nepal, Thailand, Philippines and parts of India. In September 2007, Marie Hilao-Enriquez, Karapatan secretary-general, formally petitioned the United Nations Human Rights Council (UNHRC) to direct the Philippine government to stop the extrajudicial killings. She filed the report on 60 cases of killings recorded by Karapatan from January to June 2007 alone, with 17 cases of disappearances, 12 of torture, and 113 of illegal arrests. On October 3, 2007, in Tarlac City, 69-year-old Bishop Alberto Ramento of the Iglesia Filipina Independiente, or Philippine Independent Church, and a vocal critic of killings under the Arroyo government, was stabbed 7 times and killed. The December 11, 2006, Philippines National Police's Task Force Usig reported 115 cases of “slain party list /militant members” and 26 cases of “mediamen” since 2001. The Philippine Daily Inquirer published 299 killings from October 2001 and April 2007 (See e.g. Alcuin Papa, “3 US solons to PNP: Respect human rights,” Philippine Daily Inquirer, April 18, 2007).

The December 2007 year-end report of Karapatan (Alliance for the Advancement of People's Rights) noted only 68 extrajudicial killings compared to 209 victims in 2006. Karapatan also reported 16,307 human rights violations just for 2007 (which included killings and forcible displacement of communities). Therefore, aside from the 887 killings since 2001 under Mrs. Arroyo, Karapatan, just for 2007, recorded 35 victims of political killings; 26 of enforced or involuntary disappearance; 8 of abduction; 29 of torture; 129 of illegal arrest; 116 of illegal detention; 330 of threat, harassment and intimidation; 7,542 of forcible evacuation or displacement, 3,600 of “hamletting”, interalia. As only solution, it petitioned for the resignation of Mrs. Arroyo. (with 356 left-wing activists murdered). The Philippines armed forces battled the Communists since 1969, with about 40,000 victims killed, and it had to ward off killings by Muslim radicals. However, Justice Undersecretary Ricardo Blancaflor, head of Task Force on Political Violence contradicted Karapatan's submission only on the number of killings. PNP's Task Force Usig, according to Blancaflor noted only 141 cases, of which, only 114 are party-list members or leftist activists.

On December 13, 2007, Philippine Human Rights Commissioner Dominador Calamba II, at the Philippine Working Group for an ASEAN Human Rights Mechanism forum denounced the failure of the government in its treaty reporting to the United Nations, due to "13 reports overdue" (reports due on implementation of international covenants signed by the Philippines to solve discrimination, forced disappearances and extrajudicial killings). Calamba reported 383 killings filed with the CHR, of which 145 were extrajudicial or political in form.

On January 1, 2008, the National Union of Journalists (NUJ) paid tribute to 171 journalists killed in 2007. Citing data published by International Federation of Journalists: Iraq was number one, with 65 deaths; in the Philippines, 6 journalists killed in 2007 were Hernani Pastolero (Sultan Kudarat), Carmelito Palacios (Nueva Ecija), Dodie Nunez (Cavite), Geruncio "Oscar" Mondejar (Mandaue), Vicente Sumalpong (Tawi-Tawi) and Fernando "Batman" Lintuan (Davao City); 54 journalists were murdered under the administration of President Gloria Macapagal Arroyo. In 2006, INSI stated that the Philippines was the 2nd most dangerous country for journalists, next to Iraq, listing 15 work-related journalists murdered. On January 4, 2008, the International Federation of Journalists (IFJ) Asia-Pacific director Jacqueline Park denounced the murders of broadcasters Fernando Lintuan in Davao City and former journalist Romelito Oval, Jr. It petitioned the Philippine government to fully investigate 2007 journalists' killings: "5 journalists as well as Oval were killed in the Philippines in 2007, which is shocking and reveals the extreme dangers that journalists face every day in trying to carry out their work. There will be no press freedom in the Philippines until this (situation) changes." On January 4, 2008, Anakpawis Rep. Crispin Beltran filed House Resolution 299 with the House of Representatives of the Philippines to investigate the murders and harassment of trade union/labor leaders in the Philippines. He cited the 2007 annual Survey of Trade Union Rights Violations of the International Trade Union Confederation: "33 of the total 144 cases of trade union killings worldwide happened in the Philippines; and 800 cases of beatings and torture of trade unionists in the country." On January 9, 2008, PNP Task Force Usig announced that 3 policemen, 11 soldiers and 3 militiamen had been arrested or named suspects in killings of journalists and militants since 2001. Director Jefferson P. Soriano submitted the report with the 17 names to PNP chief Avelino Razon. As of December 10, Task Force Usig had prosecuted 113 killings cases of party-list members, leftist activists, and 27 journalists.

Twin horrible deaths happened on/circa the same day the previous year, January 15, 2007, that the Supreme Court of the Philippines' (logo or seal) was mysteriously burned into halves by an almost one hour afternoon fire. Despite different appeals by local and international groups, the spate of extrajudicial killings in the Philippines continued. On January 15, 2008, Reynato Puno condemned the murder of Judge Roberto Navidad, Regional Trial Court, Branch 32, Calbayog, Samar, the 15th judge to be ambushed since July 20, 1999, the 14th under the Arroyo government. While starting his vehicle, Natividad was shot in the face/left eye, at 7:10 p.m. Monday, by a lone gunman, 5'4" tall and medium-built, wearing black jacket, using a 45 caliber pistol. On Tuesday, Catholic missionary Rey Roda, Oblates of Mary Immaculate (OMI), 54, was shot dead at 8:30 p.m., when he resisted an abduction attempt by 10 unidentified armed men in a chapel in Likud Tabawan village, South Ubian, Tawi-Tawi, South Ubian. In February 1997, another OMI leader, Bishop Benjamin de Jesus was shot dead in front of the Jolo cathedral. In 2006, the Asian Human Rights Commission stated that there had been 26 priests, pastors, and churchmen who were executed or were victims of violence under the Gloria Macapagal Arroyo administration since 2001. This includes 3 priests who were reported killed just in 2007: Basilio Bautista of the Iglesia Filipina Reform Group, in Surigao del Sur, Indonesian priest Fransiskus Madhu, in Kalinga province, and Catholic priest Florante Rigonan, in Ilocos Norte. On January 19, 2008, the Catholic Bishops Conference of the Philippines (quoting from a letter of Vatican Secretary of State Cardinal Tarciso Bertone), announced that Pope Benedict XVI "praised the courage of, and was saddened over the brutal and tragic killing of Fr. Reynaldo Roda in his ministry as head of Notre Dame School." The Pope wrote Jolo Bishop Angelito Lampon: "calls upon the perpetrators to renounce the ways of violence and to play their part in building a just and peaceful society, where all can live together in harmony."

On January 16, 2008, the New York-based international democracy watchdog Freedom House dropped or relegated the "freedom status" of the Philippines to partially free from a list of totally free countries. It based its Philippine status downgrade on the spate of political killings, "specifically targeting left-wing political activists in the country, freedom in the sloped downward." On January 18, 2008, the Kilusang Magbubukid ng Pilipinas (KMP), led by KMP chairman Rafael "Ka Paeng" Mariano (president of the Anakpawis), condemned the January 12 kidnapping and January 16 extrajudicial killing and torture of their farmer and local leader Teldo Rebamonte, 45, Masbate People's Organization (who was supposed to join the commemoration of the Mendiola Massacre) in Barangay Nabasagan, Concepcion in Claveria, Burias Island, Masbate. On January 23, Karapatan announced that the two latest victims of extrajudicial killings were: Tildo Rebamonte, 45, a Claveria, Masbate carpenter, who was gunned down on January 16, four days after he was allegedly kidnapped by the Philippine National Police’s Regional Mobile Group; and ex-political prisoner Ronald Sendrijas, 35, who was shot dead in Tagbilaran City, Bohol on January 17. On January 23, 2008, (or in just nine days after the murder of a priest) Pastor Felicisimo Catambis, 60, of the United Church of Christ in the Philippines (UCCP) in Catugan, Barangay (village) Balucawe, Leyte town was shot dead by a still unknown assailant.

On March 14, 2008, Filipino lawyer Edre Olalia (lead officer of the National Union of Peoples’ Lawyers and the Counsels for the Defense of Liberties) brought the Philippine case and appealed to the United Nations Human Rights Council (UNHRC), in its 7th Geneva session "to stop the extrajudicial killings and abductions in the Philippines". Philippines killings will be examined in the first UNHRC session, periodic review from April 7 to 18, along with those in 15 others of 192 member-countries.

Deepak Obhrai, Parliamentary Secretary to the Minister of Foreign Affairs, in a statement at Canada's House of Commons, commended "the laudable role of the Supreme Court in the preservation of human rights and in the pursuit of justice." Canadian Ambassador Robert Desjanis sent the document to Chief Justice Reynato Puno "to underline the value that the government of Canada attaches to your efforts in this regard as well as to our continued collaboration in the Justice Reform Initiatives Support Project." In the March 2008 US Department of State, 2007 Country Reports on Human Rights Practices, the US found that extrajudicial and political killings, including those of journalists, by members of the military, police, Communist rebels and other terrorist groups / perpetrators continue to be a major problem in the Philippines. The report added that "despite intensified efforts by the Philippine government to investigate and prosecute these cases, many went unsolved and unpunished." The delegates to the 6th Congress of the National Union of Journalists of the Philippines (NUJP) led by chairperson Jose Torres Jr. renewed calls to end unabated media killings. The NUJP reported that the number of journalists murdered swelled from 60 in 2001 to 96 in 2008. The most recent victims were gunned down local radio broadcasters of Radio Mindanao Network, Dennis Cuesta from General Santos, and Martin Roxas of Roxas City, Capiz. The NUJP declared August 20, a "National Day of Mourning" as journalists wore black in protest, as they paid tribute to slain media practitioners at the Bantayog ng mga Bayani in Quezon City.

On August 18, 2014, after Major General Jovito Palparan was charged for kidnapping and serious illegal detention, angry relatives of forced disappearance victims gathered at the Bulacan Provincial Jail where Palparan was to be detained. Tension rose when some militant members tried to approach and hit Palparan with a protest banner. Palparan was convicted in 2018 for the kidnapping and disappearance of Sherlyn Cadapan and Karen Empeno.

In popular culture 
In June 2019, Watch List (Maria), a feature film thriller directed by Ben Rekhi about a single mother and recovering drug addict who makes a devil's bargain with a police death squad in Manila, premiered and was nominated for a jury prize at the Seattle International Film Festival.

See also
 Davao Death Squad
 Marlene Garcia-Esperat
 Deaths of Kian delos Santos, Carl Arnaiz and Reynaldo de Guzman
 Red-tagging in the Philippines
 Negros Island killings

References

External links
 Ang Pangako - Interactive Philippine Drug War Victim Map (click on Victims panel toggle button at upper left)
 Summary and Extrajudicial Killings in the Philippines.pdf , A Submission to the United Nations Human Rights Council for the Universal Periodic Review of the Philippines (3rd Cycle, 27th Session, 2017), (Ateneo Human Rights Center)
 Case Unclosed: Desaparecidos

Monitoring organizations
icaed.org, International campaign for UN Convention to protect all persons from enforced disappearance
Desaparecidos.org www.desaparecidos.org (in English & Spanish)
"The Commissar Vanishes"Nikolai Yezhov airbrushed out of a picture with Joseph Stalin;
www.ic-mp.org, The International Commission on Missing Persons
www2.ohchr.org, Official website
news.bbc.co.uk, BBC News Special on Special Rapporteurs
Amnesty International
Human Rights Watch
www.gmanews.tv, Priest, judge slain, as spate of RP killings remains unsolved
www.manilatimes.net, Puno condemns killing of judge in Calbayog (archived from the original on 2009-06-30)
I-TEAM REPORT - ‘Political killings not official but an unintended policy’
supremecourt.gov.ph, National Summit on Extra Judicial Killings
omct.org, World Organization Against Torture
List of Issues arising from the Initial-Fourth Periodic Report of the Philippines to the Committee on Economic, Social and Cultural Rights Philippines 
extrajudicialexecutions.org/ extrajudicialexecutions.org, Philippines: Editorial on the Davao Death Squad and Killing of Journalists
Philip Alston, UN Special Rapporteur on Extrajudicial, Summary or Arbitrary Executions
extrajudicialexecutions.org, About the Special Rapporteur on Extrajudicial Executions
extrajudicialexecutions.org, Special Rapporteur’s report on the Philippines (archived from the original on 2008-08-13)
stopthekillings.org, Dangerous, Regime, Defiant People - KARAPATAN 2007 Human Rights Report
stopthekillings.org, KARAPATAN 2007 Human Rights Report
List of Extrajudicial Killings as of April 25, 2006, Karapatan Documentation Committee
pnp.gov.ph, REBUTTALS TO ALLEGATIONS MADE BY WITNESSES DURING THE U.S. SENATE SUB-COMMITTEE ON EAST ASIAN AND PACIFIC AFFAIRS‛“HEARING ON VIOLENCE RELATED TO EXTRA-JUDICIAL KILLINGS IN THE PHILIPPINES” HELD ON 14 MARCH 2007 (archived from the original on 2008-07-06)
US Department of State, Philippines, International Religious Freedom Report 2007, Released by the Bureau of Democracy, Human Rights, and Labor
2007 International Religious Freedom Report
US Department of State, Philippines, Country Reports on Human Rights Practices - 2007, Released by the Bureau of Democracy, Human Rights, and Labor March 11, 2008
Journalists condemn unsolved media killings, May 3, 2008
RP, others top 'Impunity Index' for slain journalists, May 3, 2008

Philippines
Dirty wars
Enforced disappearance
Counterterrorism
Emergency laws in the Philippines
Kidnappings in the Philippines
Political repression in the Philippines
Torture
Terrorism in the Philippines
Politics of the Philippines by issue
Philippine criminal law
Murder in the Philippines
Political and cultural purges
Human rights abuses in the Philippines